Michał Zdzisław Zamoyski (1679–1735) was a Polish nobleman (szlachcic).

Michał became the 6th Ordynat of Zamość estate. He was Great Łowczy of the Crown since 1714, voivode of Smolensk Voivodeship since 1732 and starost of Gniew, Bratian, Lebork, Bolemów. He became Knight of the Order of the White Eagle, awarded on 3 August 1732.

1679 births
1735 deaths
Michal Zdzisla
Voivodes of Smolensk